Anthony Charles Edwards (born July 19, 1962) is an American actor and director. He is known for his role as Dr. Mark Greene on the first eight seasons of ER, for which he received a Golden Globe award and six Screen Actors Guild Awards, and was nominated for four consecutive Primetime Emmy Awards. He has appeared in various films and television series, including Top Gun, Zodiac, Gotcha!, Miracle Mile, Revenge of the Nerds, Planes, Northern Exposure and Designated Survivor.

Early life
Edwards was born in Santa Barbara, California, the son of Erika Kem Edwards Plack (née Weber), an artist/landscape painter, and Peter Edwards, an architect to whom he was one of five children His maternal grandfather was designer Kem Weber. He is partly of German and Irish descent. He  graduated from San Marcos High School in 1980.  Edwards was encouraged by his parents to attend college before pursuing his interest in acting, which grew from the area's theater community. He received a scholarship to the Royal Academy of Dramatic Arts in England and studied theatre at the University of Southern California; but by the age of nineteen was being offered enough acting work to enable him to leave college.

Career

Television and film

It was Edwards' role as LTJG Nick "Goose" Bradshaw alongside Tom Cruise in the 1986 film Top Gun that brought his first widespread public acknowledgment. His character, who died in an aviation accident, was among the most prominent and popular in the film. Scenes with him and his film family (played by Meg Ryan and Aaron and Adam Weis) were later reprised as flashbacks in the 2022 sequel Top Gun: Maverick.

Edwards' best-known role is as Dr. Mark Greene on the long-running TV series ER, from the series premiere in 1994 to the end of the eighth season in 2002. The series also afforded Edwards his first opportunity to direct. Edwards' desire to pursue directing led to his request to be written out of the series. He reportedly earned $35 million for three seasons on ER, which made him one of television's highest-paid actors. Edwards received four Primetime Emmy Award nominations for ER. He won a Golden Globe Award For Best Performance by an Actor-In a TV Series after being nominated four times and he has two Screen Actor's Guild Awards. In 2008, Edwards returned to ER to reprise his role as Dr. Greene (in flashback scenes, where he treats the dying son of character Catherine Banfield) for one episode during its 15th and final season. Following ER, he took some time to raise his children, appreciating the privilege that his ER salary provided.

In 2010, Edwards appeared in the movie Motherhood, which set a record for the biggest bomb in British cinema history by garnering £88 on 11 tickets on opening weekend. Motherhood did not fare much better in the United States, earning $93,388 in three weeks of release. At the time, he said he took the role because "it seemed like a very organic and real thing. It really kind of reminded me of what the dynamic in a family is like."

Edwards reunited with Val Kilmer, another actor from Top Gun, when he voiced one of the fighter jets in the Disneytoon Studios film Planes.

In 2018, Edwards was cast in the recurring role in the third season of Netflix's Designated Survivor as Mars Harper, the President's Chief of Staff.

In 2022, Edwards was cast as Alan Reed in Netflix’s docu-series Inventing Anna.

Honors and awards
Edwards received four Emmy nominations for Outstanding Lead Actor in a Drama Series for ER and won as an executive producer on Outstanding Television Movie winner Temple Grandin. He earned a People's Choice Award for Favorite Male Performer in a New Television Series (1995); and won six Screen Actors Guild Awards for: Outstanding Performance by a Male Actor in a Drama Series (1996 and 1998), and Best Ensemble Cast (1996, 1997, 1998 and 1999).  He won the Golden Globe Award for Best Performance by an Actor in a Television Drama in 1998).

Edwards also won a Daytime Emmy for the production of the underground rock documentary N.Y.H.C. (1999) and the telepic adaptation of Kimberly Willis Holt's 1998 coming of age novel My Louisiana Sky (2001), and earned the Carnegie Medal Award for My Louisiana Sky (2003).

Theater
After a long career in television, Edwards made his Broadway debut as his second act in 2018 in the revival of Children of a Lesser God at Studio 54. In 2015 he appeared in Classic Stage Company's A Month in the Country but his stage acting career began when he was growing up in Santa Barbara.

On May 13, 2022, Edwards made his unexpected Broadway musical debut when he appeared as Dr. Walker in the Broadway production of Girl from the North Country due to COVID-19 cases impacting the cast. The show also stars his wife, Mare Winningham.

Personal life
Edwards was married to Jeanine Lobell, with whom he had one son and three daughters, from 1994–2015. At the end of 2021, Edwards and long-time friend and fellow actor Mare Winningham eloped.

On November 10, 2017, Edwards wrote an essay on Medium, in which he stated that screenwriter/producer Gary Goddard befriended and then sexually assaulted him and several of his friends "for years" beginning when they were 12 years old.

Edwards has been a licensed private pilot since 2012.

Filmography

Film

Television

Producer

References

External links 

 

1962 births
Living people
American people of German descent
American people of Irish descent
American male film actors
American male television actors
Male actors from Santa Barbara, California
USC School of Dramatic Arts alumni
Daytime Emmy Award winners
Best Drama Actor Golden Globe (television) winners
Outstanding Performance by a Male Actor in a Drama Series Screen Actors Guild Award winners
20th-century American male actors
21st-century American male actors
American male voice actors
Television producers from California
Film producers from California
American television directors
Primetime Emmy Award winners